Thomas Garfield Anderson (31 January 1942 – 1 April 2020), known as Tony Anderson, was an Australian rules footballer who played for Melbourne in the VFL during the 1960s.

Anderson made his VFL debut with Melbourne in 1963 and would form an important part of their defence throughout the rest of the decade. He was a half back flanker in Melbourne's 1964 premiership side and by the time he retired in 1969 had amassed 75 league games.

Anderson died on 1 April 2020, at the age of 78.

References

External links

DemonWiki profile

1942 births
2020 deaths
Australian rules footballers from Victoria (Australia)
Melbourne Football Club players
Melbourne Football Club Premiership players
One-time VFL/AFL Premiership players